Đorđe Kaplanović (born 21 March 1995) is a Serbian professional basketball player for Kumanovo of the Macedonian First League.

Professional career 
On 27 September 2020, Kaplanović signed a contract for Sloboda Tuzla of the Basketball Championship of Bosnia and Herzegovina for the 2020–21 season. On 13 January 2021, Kaplanović signed for Zlatibor. Later, he was released prior his debut for Zlatibor.

References

External links
Djordje Kaplanovic at eurobasket.com

1995 births
Living people
ABA League players
Asseco Gdynia players
Basketball League of Serbia players
Centers (basketball)
KK FMP players
KK Crvena zvezda players
KK Metalac Valjevo players
OKK Sloboda Tuzla players
Montenegrin expatriate basketball people in Poland
Montenegrin expatriate basketball people in Serbia
Power forwards (basketball)
Serbian expatriate basketball people in Bosnia and Herzegovina
Serbian expatriate basketball people in North Macedonia
Serbian expatriate basketball people in Poland
Serbian expatriate basketball people in Romania
Serbian men's basketball players
Serbs of Montenegro